John Wardall was Master of St Catharine's College, Cambridge from 1487 until 1506.

Wardall was born in Beelsby and educated at St Catharine's. After graduating MA he was ordained and held livings at Sparham and Lamport. He was buried at St Mary Bothaw on 5 February 1506.

References 

People from the Borough of North East Lincolnshire
15th-century English people
16th-century English people
Masters of St Catharine's College, Cambridge
Fellows of St Catharine's College, Cambridge
Alumni of St Catharine's College, Cambridge
1506 deaths